Kinkead is a surname. Notable people with the surname include:

 Charles Kinkead (1913–2007), Jamaican photojournalist
 Eugene F. Kinkead (1876–1960), American politician
 John Henry Kinkead (1826–1904), American politician
 Maeve Kinkead (born 1946), American actress
 Samuel Kinkead (1897–1928), South African aviator